Debra! (originally Decidedly Debra!) is a Canadian live-action sitcom that focuses on 14-year-old Debra Delong, who wants to make her own company and wants to run it with a boy named Preston Lunford. The series was created by Andrew Nicholls, and Darrell Vickers, and produced by Cookie Jar Group. Debra! is executive-produced by Stacey Stewart Curtis, and produced by Kevin May. The series was cancelled on January 1, 2012.

Characters
 Deborah "Debra" Carnegie Cameron Delong (portrayed by Niamh Wilson) – Debra is a perky 14-year-old girl who wants to create her own company and improve the world.
 Preston Lunford (portrayed by Will Jester) – Preston is a smart and quiet guy, who is a musician, guitarist, and also a magician. He is in his own band, and ends up hanging with Debra (even when he doesn't want to).
 Auzzie Pilditch (portrayed by Austin MacDonald) – Auzzie thinks he is the world's gift to girls and often tries to get everyone to think he is special. He is a member of Preston's band.
 Brud Branson (portrayed by James Coholan) – Brud is of a good nature. He and Auzzie are close friends. He plays the drums for he, Preston and Auzzie's band FLOORdeVOTED.
 Dancy Cologne (portrayed by Alicia Josipovic) – Dancy was originally Debra's best friend, but not anymore. She's Debra's worst enemy and is the high school's "Queenager."

Episodes

Accolades

International broadcast

References

External links
 

2010s Canadian sitcoms
2010s Canadian teen sitcoms
2011 Canadian television series debuts
2012 Canadian television series endings
English-language television shows
Family Channel (Canadian TV network) original programming
Television series about teenagers
Television series by Cookie Jar Entertainment
Television series by DHX Media